Bradley Crandall (born Robert Lee Bradley; August 6, 1927 – March 14, 1991) was an American radio personality, voice-over announcer, and film narrator, best known for his radio show on WNBC in New York City, which aired from March 1964 to September 1971.

Life and career
Born in Herington, Kansas, Crandall served with the U.S. Marine Corps where he was deployed to China in 1947 and stayed for two years. In the U.S. Air Force during the Korean War, he became a disc jockey, known as Brad Bradley, using an Air Force mobile radio broadcasting unit. While still in the military, he attended Millsaps College in Jackson, Mississippi. In civilian life, he worked at radio stations in Texas and Florida under his pseudonym Brad Crandall. He was hired at CKEY in Toronto, Canada, before joining WNBC in 1964. It was in Toronto that he changed from music programs to a radio phone-in format.

In New York City, Crandall did voice-over commercials for many national clients, including narrating classified films for the army. His New York success was covered in a Time magazine article published on May 1, 1964. In 1967, he changed his name legally to Bradley Crandall.

After moving his family to Los Angeles in the 1970s, Crandall did on-camera narrations for popular documentaries produced by Sunn Classic Pictures, including In Search of Noah's Ark (1976), The Lincoln Conspiracy (1977), Beyond and Back (1978), In Search of Historic Jesus (1979), Encounter with Disaster (1979) and The Bermuda Triangle (1979).
He also did narrating work for NFL Films in the 1980s.  
At the time of his death from kidney failure at 63, Crandall lived on his boat in Redondo Beach, California.

Influence
As a young man, Howard Stern was influenced by Crandall.

References

External links
 

1991 deaths
American talk radio hosts
Millsaps College alumni
NFL Films people
1927 births
People from Herington, Kansas
United States Marines
United States Air Force personnel of the Korean War